Ganna Pogrebna (born July 4, 1980) is a British behavioral scientist, decision theorist, educator, author, and academic writer. She currently serves as the Lead for Behavioral Data Science at the Alan Turing Institute, the Executive Director of the Artificial Intelligence and Cyber Futures Institute at Charles Sturt University, and an Honorary Professor of Behavioral Business Analytics and Data Science at the University of Sydney.

She is well-known for her work in combining data science methods with those from economics and psychology to model human behavior under risk and uncertainty.

Education
Pogrebna holds a master's degree in economics from the University of Missouri, Kansas City, and has obtained her Ph.D. in economics and social sciences from the University of Innsbruck, Austria.

Career
Pogrebna is a researcher and academic in behavioral business analytics and data science. She currently serves as Executive Director of the Artificial Intelligence and Cyber Futures Institute at Charles Sturt University in Australia and holds a research professorship position at the University of Sydney Business School. Additionally, she is a Lead of Behavioral Data Science at the Alan Turing Institute in London.

Pogrebna has taught and supervised students in data science, cyber security, behavioral data science, business analytics and artificial intelligence. She has also worked as a consultant for private and public sector companies in various industries. Pogrebna communicates her research to a wider audience through her YouTube blog "Data Driven" and "Inclusion AI. Blog", and is a regular contributor to various blogs and media outlets. She is methods editor at Leadership Quarterly and associate editor of Judgement and Decision Making.

Notable research works
In 2021, her team's box office predicting technology was discussed at an expert panel at the Stockholm Film Festival. In 2018, she co-developed a model predicting parental risk attitudes based on the characteristics of children, revealing gender inequalities in parenting. In 2019, she contributed to a Council of Europe study on the implications of advanced digital technologies for human rights. In 2020-2021, she researched handwashing patterns and protected vulnerable groups during the COVID-19 pandemic. In 2022, Pogrebna's work highlighted the threats and benefits of software products used in schools and at home.

Bibliography
 Navigating New Cyber Risks: How Businesses can Plan, Build and Manage Safe Spaces in the Digital Age, co-author (2019)
 Big Bad Bias Book (2021)

Awards and honors
 British Academy of Management Award (2018)
 Pogrebna's work in risk analytics and modeling has been recognized through the Leverhulme Research Fellowship award.
 In January 2020, she was named the winner of TechWomen100, an award for leading female experts in Science, Technology, Engineering, and Mathematics in the UK. 
 She has also been named one of the 20+ Inspiring Data Scientists by AI Time Journal.

References

Living people

1980 births
British economists